This article is a list of events in the year 2004 in Uzbekistan.

Incumbents
 President: Islam Karimov
 Prime Minister: Shavkat Mirziyoyev

Events

January
 January 13 - Uzbekistan Airways Flight 1154 crashes in the capital, Tashkent, killing all 37 people on board.

References

 
2000s in Uzbekistan
Years of the 21st century in Uzbekistan
Uzbekistan
Uzbekistan